By the Treaty of Old Crossing (1863) and the Treaty of Old Crossing (1864), the Pembina and Red Lake bands of the Ojibwe, then known as Chippewa Indians, purportedly ceded to the United States all of their rights to the Red River Valley. On the North Dakota side, the ceded territory included all of the Red River Valley north of the Sheyenne River.

This was a river ford and layover resting site normally used by Red River ox carts using the "Pembina" or "Woods" trail, one of several routes known as the Red River trails  between Pembina and the settlements at Mendota and St Anthony.

Background
Prior to 1863, Ojibwe and Dakota or "Sioux" tribes had fought over hunting rights in the territory of the Red River Valley for at least a century, but the Ojibwe were the predominant possessors of the land before the first European fur traders began to frequent the valley in the late 18th century. Rapid development of the Pembina trade with St. Paul on the Red River trails led to a drive for American settlement and development of the surrounding flat valley lands.

The pressure to oust "Indians" from the American portion of the Red River Valley dated back well before Minnesota statehood (1858) to the early years of the Minnesota Territory. U.S. Army Major Samuel Woods, on his expedition in 1849 to locate a site on the Red River of the North for a military post, also was ordered to proceed further north to Pembina, where he was "to hold conferences with the Indians and learn whether their lands in the Red River Valley may be purchased and opened for white settlement." These instructions came directly from the Secretary of the Interior, Thomas Ewing, who, with the approval of President Zachary Taylor, suggested the United States should acquire the Indian lands so the area could be thrown open to agricultural settlement. After locating the site for what later became Fort Abercrombie, Major Woods continued downriver to Pembina, where he spent 25 days and met first with Dakota and then with Ojibwe and Métis from the Pembina band as well as members of the Red River band, but reached no specific agreement for land cessions.

Earlier negotiations with the Ojibwe bands

The Dakota relinquished any claim to the Red River Valley in the Treaty of Traverse des Sioux and to most of the rest of the future State of Minnesota in the Treaty of Mendota in 1851. In the face of opposition from Southern states concerned about the balance of free and slave states as a result of Minnesota expansionism, and in order to preserve and obtain ratification of the Sioux treaties and land cessions which also had just been secured, the Northern sponsors of the Pembina treaty withdrew their support, the Senate denied confirmation, and the Ojibwe land cession failed.

With the introduction of steamboat operations on the Red River and plans for railroad development in Northwest Minnesota, the clamor for development and settlement south of the 49th parallel continued unabated throughout the 1850s. Incursions into Ojibwe territory on the part of fur traders and others were common.  A leading trader and Métis state legislator, Joseph Rolette, even started a townsite called "Douglas" at the Old Crossing which was designated by the Legislature as the first county seat of Polk County. The Ojibwe objected to the peremptory establishment of a town on their unceded territory, and the Legislature removed the county seat to Crookston, but demands for doing something about the "sullen Chippewa" and their claims to the territory continued to mount and by 1862 had risen to a crescendo.

After the onset of the Civil War, with factional Southern opposition to expansion of the free states no longer a factor, and still urged on by railroad interests and other promoters of development and settlement in the area, the United States in 1862 renewed efforts to negotiate a "treaty" with Ojibwe tribes for the cession of the Red River Valley.  Several tribal chiefs were invited to treat at the Grand Forks of the Red Lake River and Red River.  These Ojibwe negotiators were encamped there late that summer, waiting for the United States negotiators, when skirmishing in the Sioux Uprising (now generally called the Dakota War of 1862) spread to the Red River Valley, forcing the United States negotiators to take refuge in Fort Abercrombie. In the aftermath of the Uprising, United States troops and Minnesota militia chased the Dakota out of the Red River Valley for good and the fur traders and steamship operators renewed efforts to have the politicians wrest the territory from the Ojibwe.

Alexander Ramsey and the backdrop of the Dakota Conflict

The lead negotiator for the United States in the Treaties of Old Crossing was Alexander Ramsey, a former Governor of the Territory of Minnesota and the first Governor of the new state of Minnesota. In direct response to the "Sioux Outbreak", Ramsey offered a $25/scalp bounty on the Sioux before  resigning as governor in order to accept a federal appointment as Indian Commissioner late in the spring of 1863.

When the Old Crossing treaty negotiations were set to resume in 1863, the nerves of settlers, soldiers and politicians were still raw from the panic and fear induced by the Dakota Conflict of the previous summer.  State and Federal officials had launched a retaliatory campaign of removal and extermination against the Dakota while tension mounted on the frontier between settlers and all other Indians, which continued throughout the fall and winter of 1862-63. The strained relationship between the Ojibwe bands and the intruding steamboat operators and fur traders grew increasingly testy, as charges and counter-charges of trespass and "depredations" went both ways. Rumors of alliances between the Dakota and the Ojibwe were rampant, and fear of a sympathetic "insurrection" by the "whole body of the Chippewa" were widespread.

Governor Ramsey's most notorious accomplishment had been to order a vicious and indiscriminate retaliatory strikes by Minnesota Infantry against various Dakota settlements in reaction to the Dakota Conflict in 1862. In the words of Governor Ramsey, 

Our course then is plain. The Sioux Indians of Minnesota must be exterminated or driven forever beyond the borders of the state. 

Immediately afterward, all treaties with the Dakota were abrogated by Congressional action, and all Dakota were ordered removed from the state to reservations in Dakota Territory.

Throughout the spring and summer of 1863,  Minnesota Infantry under General Henry Sibley, operating on the orders of Governor Ramsey, along with United States forces under the command of General John Pope, were carrying out a series of punitive expeditions against escaping "renegade" Dakota bands throughout the Red River Valley and the Devils Lake and Upper Missouri areas of Dakota Territory.

During the weeks leading up the Old Crossing Treaty, former Governor Ramsey carried out a series of treaty negotiations with Ojibwe tribes in his new capacity as the Indian Commissioner for Minnesota, securing territory throughout the state in exchange for nominal consideration and reservations.  Meanwhile, Governor Ramsey's successor, Governor Henry A. Swift, issued a series of executive orders increasing the "bounties" to $200/Indian scalp.  Some did not distinguish between Dakota marauders and others, such as the Pillager, Red Lake and Pembina bands of Ojibwe. Also during the days and weeks preceding the negotiations at Old Crossing, Minnesota Volunteer Cavalry ranged up and down the Red River Valley on both sides from Pembina to Ft. Abercrombie. These military operations were directed primarily against the Dakota, but several cavalry detachments also were sent out from Fort Abercrombie and Fort Ridgely in a deliberate attempt to "produce a moral effect on the Pillagers and other Chippewa bands".

It was against this backdrop of fear and intentional intimidation of the Ojibwe as part of the reaction to the Dakota Conflict, that Commissioner Ramsey resumed the quest to gain for United States development interests the territory of the Ojibwe bands in Northwestern Minnesota. This was not Governor Ramsey's first attempt to obtain the cession of the Valley from the Ojibwe. In the same year, Governor Ramsey also negotiated the Treaty of Traverse des Sioux and the Treaty of Mendota, whereby the Dakota and certain Ojibwe bands had ceded the vast majority of Minnesota territory south and east of the Red River Valley.

1863 treaty

Arriving at the treaty site on September 21, 1863, with a cavalcade of "290 army men, 340 mules, 180 horses, 55 big oxen and 90 vehicles and wagons", ex-Governor Ramsey set up his tent while the soldiers set up a Gatling gun trained on the assembled Red Lake band of Ojibwe on the opposite side of the river.  A day or two later, the Pembina band arrived, and negotiations ensued. Initially, Ramsey offered a paltry $20,000 for a "right of passage", an offer that was roundly rejected as he undoubtedly expected it would be.  Over the next several days, a psychological battle of wills pitted the Ojibwe negotiators, most of whom disclaimed any interest in selling their land, against the impatient Ramsey, who feigned disinterest in acquiring their land and invited a counteroffer.  Eventually, on October 2, 1863, Ramsey and his co-commissioner, Ashley C. Morril, induced the so-called "chiefs, headmen and warriors" of the Pembina Band and Red Lake Band to sign the Treaty of Old Crossing (1863). 
 
The United States treaty negotiators had overtly misrepresented the purpose and effect of the proposed treaty as merely conveying a "right of passage" over the Ojibwe lands to the United States.  The United States intention to bring in settlers as well as the railroad had been an established policy for years, as was plainly stated in newspapers and governmental reports of the time.  Governor Ramsey's journal of the treaty negotiations contained his speech to the assembled Ojibwe in which he, as a trained lawyer and experienced politician and Indian negotiator, directly misrepresented the purpose and intent of the treaty: 

Now, there is growing up a trade of considerable importance between the British settlements on the north and the American settlements on the south. ... Now, this is a trade which cannot and must not be interrupted.  And their Great Father, feeling this, and desirous to prevent any trouble between his white and red people, has sent us here to come to some understanding with you about it.  Their Great Father has no especial desire to get possession of their lands.  He does not want their lands at all if they do not want to part with them.  He has more land now than he knows what to do with.  He simply wishes that his people should enjoy the privilege of traveling through their country on steamboats and wagons unmolested 

Even after the initial proposal for a mere right of way was rejected, he was representing that if they sold their land, the Ojibwe could still occupy it and hunt on it for a long time.

The text of the treaty presented by Ramsey and Morril in fact ceded Ojibwe control and ownership of all of the territory (Article 2) to the United States, while "compensating" the signing bands with annuity payments of $20,000 per year to be divided up and paid to individual members of the two bands over a period of twenty years (Article 3).  It provided a mechanism for non-Indian claims against the signatory Ojibwe bands to be reviewed by a commission appointed by the President of the United States in consultation with the Ojibwe bands, and appropriated $100,000 to be used to pay claims of individuals (whites) for past Indian wrongs, while relieving the Red Lake Band and Pembina Band of the threat of "punishment for past offenses". (Article 4).  It left the "chiefs" of two of the bands with "reservations" consisting of 640 acres (one square mile) each (Article 9) and provided other direct inducements to the "chiefs" in the form of direct cash payments (Article 5).  In lieu of annuity payments, it also provided for payment to the Métis or "half-breed" relatives of the Chippewa (Ojibwe) who were citizens of the United States the right to obtain scrip entitling the holder to claim  anywhere within the ceded territory or elsewhere that was opened up for homestead by the United States (Article 8).

1863 treaty signatory representatives

"Signed in the Presence Of:"

Background of the 1864 amendments and supplemental treaty

Afterwards, it was stated that the Ojibwe signatories of the 1863 treaty did not know the character of the treaty they had made and, in the words of the Episcopal Bishop Henry Whipple, it was "from beginning to end a fraud...". It is said that the principal "translator" involved in the negotiations, Paul H. Beaulieu, was familiar only with Dakota languages and the "Chippewa Métis" creole language and not with the Ojibwe words and meanings as used by the Red Lake Band and other non-Métis Ojibwe people. Governor Ramsey bragged that it was the lowest price per acre ever paid for Indian land cessions in the history of the United States.

The United States Senate refused to ratify the treaty on the grounds that it was "too generous to the chiefs", and sent back an amended treaty with the demand that the Ojibwe capitulate to the revisions. The Senate eliminated language which would have diverted unused portions of the $100,000 indemnity fund to the chiefs after settlement of all just claims, and instead provided for any unutilized funds to be added to the annuity payments to be distributed directly to members of the bands on a per capita basis. It also added a proviso to Article 8, prohibiting any assignment of the half-breed scrip until after the patent had been issued to the original claimant, after 5 years of proving up the claim.

As a result of the unilateral alterations to the unratified treaty imposed by the Senate, several original Indian signers of the 1863 treaty refused to sign the amended version.  Nonetheless, the "treaty" was re-executed by the United States Commissioners along with certain representatives of the bands who had been taken to Washington, D.C. for this purpose, all of whom  signed the amended treaty on April 12, 1864.  This version of the treaty was then signed by President Abraham Lincoln, in early May 1864.

After negotiating the initial Treaty of Old Crossing in 1863, Ramsey had been appointed to the United States Senate before the follow-up treaty negotiations in 1864, and probably played a role in approving the ensuing revisions to the treaty he had just negotiated.

1864 supplemental treaty

One of the dissatisfied chiefs from the Red Lake Band recruited Bishop Whipple to assist in an effort to enhance the benefits of the treaty to the Red Lake and Pembina Ojibwe.  This resulted in a supplemental treaty, sometimes called the Treaty of Old Crossing (1864) but entirely negotiated in Washington, D.C., which in some ways enhanced the benefits of the treaty to the signatory bands and in other ways assured that much of the indemnity fund would never find its way back to the tribes.

The 1864 supplement reduced the $20,000 annuity to $15,000, but specifically allocated $10,000 per year to the Red Lake band and $5,000 per year to the Pembina band (to be distributed per capita directly to individual members of each band).  It eliminated the fixed term of 20 years and provided for the annuity to be paid "during the pleasure of the President".   An additional annuity payment of $12,000 ($8,000 for the Red Lake band and $4,000 for the Pembina band) was established for a period of 15 years, with these payments to be made to the bands in common for agricultural assistance and materials to make clothing and "other useful articles".  The United States also committed to provide a sawmill, to furnish a blacksmith, physician, miller and farmer, and to provide various blacksmithing and carpentry materials and tools with an annual value of $1500 over a period of 15 years.  In effect, these changes increased the price paid by the United States for the ceded land to about 6 cents an acre.

Other changes made to the terms of the 1863 treaty in the supplemental treaty of 1864 have provoked ongoing controversy among Ojibwe and white historians alike.  The $100,000 indemnity fund was reallocated, to provide that $25,000 would be immediately distributed to the chiefs of said bands "through their agent".  The balance of the funds were specifically earmarked for the satisfaction of specific claims for "depredations committed by said Indians" on Euro-American traders' goods at the Red Lake River and for "exactions forcibly levied by [said Indians]" on the steamship operations on the Red River, and the remainder was to be allocated pro rata in satisfaction of other claims.  The provision for collaborative review and settlement of these claims by an appointed commission in consultation with the chiefs of the Ojibwe bands was eliminated, with the determination of claims left entirely to the "agent for said bands".  In effect, the revisions transferred control of the indemnity fund to the white Indian agent and assured that none of the funds would be allocated to the Indians themselves.

The 1864 supplemental treaty also altered the provisions for half-breed scrip, restricting the holder to claims on land within the ceded territory, while eliminating restrictions on assignment or required prove-up of claims.  The Red Lake Band has renounced these aspects of the treaty, contending that none of the purported signatories for the Red Lake Band were legitimate leaders or had authority to speak for or sign away their ancestral lands, and that virtually all of the benefited Métis claimants were non-citizen relatives of members of the Pembina band who used the scrip to acquire timberlands formerly belonging to the Red Lake Band.

Signatory representatives

A legacy of fraud

Governor Ramsey virtually admitted the fraud he had perpetrated in his letter transmitting the final treaty to Congress for ratification, saying:

I stated to them very plainly, that if the offers were not agreeable to them they should make another proposition.  The Great Father had several times offered to purchase the land, not because he wanted it for settlement—at least during the lifetime of the youngest of them, but because he wanted a free passage over it ...

As Governor Ramsey was well aware, the treaty did not merely grant "a free passage".  By the text of the treaty, the signatory Ojibwe bands did "hereby cede, sell, and convey to the United States all their right, title, and interest in and to all the lands now owned and claimed by them ... within the following described boundaries:".  The intended effect of the treaty on the part of the United States negotiators in fact was to extinguish all Ojibwe interests in the land for the benefit of the United States.  This in fact was the stated objective of the treaty in all of Ramsey's communications  on the subject other than his statements to the Ojibwe during the negotiations.

Most of the indemnity fund wound up in the hands of Norman Kittson, who had pioneered steamship operations on the Red River as a means of handling a burgeoning trade with the Hudson's Bay Company.  The Ojibwe had accused Kittson of trespassing on their territory, cutting timber for fuel and starting forest fires.  At one point they had demanded tribute for the continued right to pass along the river—the "exactions forcibly levied" referred to in the text of the treaty. But Kittson's shipping operations  were already faltering as the Hudson's Bay Company withdrew from dependence on supply through the St. Paul and the Red River routes and re-established direct shipping from England via Hudson Bay, and the Sioux Uprising effectively ended the trade for most of the 1860s. The treaty indemnity payments thus may be seen as a politically inspired bailing out of Kittson from a losing position, using the excuse of Indian "depredations" which had been no more than a demand for payment by the Ojibwe for the right of passage now being exacted from them.

A legacy of self-deception

The purpose of the treaties remains a matter of confusion, some of which seems to be deliberate.  Although the Ojibwe had no involvement in the Dakota War of 1862, white agents in the press and the government freely associated the Ojibwe with the Dakota, or Sioux, and overtly argued for reduced benefits to the "Indians" due to the depredations committed on white settlers in the "Sioux Uprising". The leading historian of North Dakota, Elwyn B. Robinson, described the treaty as satisfying the "sullen Chippewa" who had "wanted to sell their land to the United States" and who had "plundered" fur traders' property and "threatened to stop the steamboat" if their long-frustrated desires were thwarted. Even as soon as 1899, Euro-Americans were characterizing the 1863 and 1864 Treaties of Old Crossing as "ending the trouble" caused by the Sioux Uprising. The official Red Lake County history tour guide still characterizes the treaty as a "peace treaty", as does the centennial history of Red Lake County, the split-off portion of the original Polk County in which the Old Crossing now is located. Describing the monument erected in 1932 to commemorate the Old Crossing Treaty, it states: 

Here at the "Old Crossing" is a monument which commemorates a peace pact....As the descendants of these self-same Indians [i.e., the Ojibwe] pause in its shadow they may well say our forefathers kept their faith, and be proud that this was done.

These self-deceptive recharacterizations of the historic purpose of the treaties overlook statements by several Ojibwe negotiators at Old Crossing who denied any interest in selling the lands of their people. They also ignore the incessant political pressure that motivated the United States treaty negotiators and the undisguised plan to force a land cession in order to allow for white settlement and agricultural development of the fertile Red River Valley that had been an express policy articulated at the Cabinet level of the United States government since at least the late 1840s.

The historical setting of the 1863 negotiations against the immediate backdrop of the panic and confusion resulting from the Sioux Uprising also has been minimized. A standard Minnesota history work states:  

Though the treaties ceding the Red River Valley followed shortly after the Sioux War, they were not in any direct sense a consequence of the outbreak.  In fact, commissioners had been sent out from Washington in 1862 to negotiate a treaty, but the plan had been interrupted by the Indian war.

While it is true that in 1863 the current United States Government efforts to induce the Ojibwe to give up their lands had been under way since 1862, and had been attempted at least once before in 1851, the immediate punitive reaction to the Uprising included a direct and unequivocal campaign of intimidation against the Ojibwe, as well as a pervasive and vicious retaliatory war against the Dakota, within a few miles of the chosen site for the negotiations.  In this respect, whatever might have been negotiated before the Uprising in 1862 can never be known, but the results of the "negotiation" with the implied force of United States Army and Minnesota militia in the immediate vicinity cannot be denied.

A legacy of incestuous connections and self-interest

The remarkable connections among the principal actors on the United States side of the treaty negotiations also are largely understated in most of the literature that has developed around the treaty. Norman Kittson, the long-time supplier of the Hudson's Bay Company, and the steamship operator who probably benefited most directly from the treaty, had been a partner of "Jolly Joe" Rolette in the abortive effort to develop the townsite of Douglas, the "Magnificent City of the West", on Ojibwe Land at the Old Crossing. Kittson, "Jolly Joe" and Pierre Bottineau previously had pioneered the Red River cart trains that supplied the Selkirk Colony and the Hudson's Bay Company in the Red River Colony. Rolette became their personal representative in the Minnesota legislature.

Henry Sibley, the marauding militia leader whose punitive expedition against the Sioux in the eastern part of Dakota Territory and throughout the Red River Valley undoubtedly played a pivotal role in the intimidation of the Red Lake and Pembina bands as well, also was a former partner in the fur trade with "Jolly Joe's father, "Old Joe" Rolette, and later recruited Norman Kittson himself as his partner in the fur trade and the supply of Hudson's Bay Company and Fort Garry.

The same Henry Sibley was the first governor of Minnesota; Alexander Ramsey was its second.  Ramsey had been the first governor of the Territory of Minnesota, and Sibley its delegate to the United States Congress.  Ramsey was appointed to the U.S. Senate immediately after his service in negotiating several treaties, including the Old Crossing Treaty, whereby virtually all Indian rights to territory outside reservations in Minnesota were finally eliminated in 1863.  "Jolly Joe" Rolette had served in both the territorial legislature (where he famously orchestrated the squelching of a corrupt move to move the capital from St. Paul to St. Peter by disappearing with the engrossed bill while the legislative session expired,) and in the state legislature (where he succeeded in having the illusory townsite of Douglas, a virtual figment of the imagination of himself and Kittson, identified as the seat of a newly created county in unceded Indian territory).

It was Kittson who invited the Woods-Pope reconnaissance of the Red River Valley in 1849 and the initial sounding out of the Ojibwe about their willingness to part with their land for United States settlement purposes, who met the expedition and provided critical information about the lay of the land and its inhabitants, and whose clerk, the younger Rolette, provided Woods and Pope lodgings and entertainment while they engaged the Red Lake and Pembina bands in "discussions" in 1849. John Pope's report produced after the 1849-50 Woods-Pope expedition extolled the agricultural potential of the Red River Valley.  This led directly to Ramsey's first negotiation with the Ojibwe to obtain a cession of the Red River Valley—the unratified Pembina Treaty of 1851—which had been directly facilitated by Henry Sibley's securing of a Congressional allocation of funds to finance Ramsey's negotiations in Pembina and by Kittson's urging of treaty negotiations to obtain Red River Valley lands for white settlement from the "reluctant tribesmen" of the Pembina and Red Lake Bands. In that case, also, Kittson had stood to gain $30,000 in payments for alleged debts owed to him by the Ojibwe.

The same John Pope was surveying the still-unceded Red River Valley for the United States Army Corps of Topographic Engineers in 1858 when he determined that the river would be suitable for steamboats. Soon after, Norman Kittson and James J. Hill started their  steamboat operations on the river, to supplement their already substantial ox cart trade. It was Kittson, as well, who got caught at Georgetown with a load of trade goods when the Sioux Uprising intervened, and who encountered the hungry and disgruntled Ojibwe encamped at Grand Forks, waiting for the United States commissioners who never arrived with the promised trade goods and provisions during the planned treaty negotiations, in 1862; it was these hungry and unhappy Ojibwe encamped at Grand Forks who confiscated some of his cargo for food  and thereby committed the "depredations by said Indians" for which Kittson later collected nearly $100,000 in indemnity payments under the treaty negotiated the next year.

The same John Pope and the same Henry Sibley were carrying out their military expeditions in the vicinity while Ramsey negotiated the Treaty of 1863.  Sibley, who had hired Pierre Bottineau as a scout and agent throughout the 1840s and 1850s during his years as a fur trader in the Red River Valley and Minnesota River Valley, also engaged Bottineau as his scout in the expedition against the Sioux of 1862-63.
    
The ubiquitous Bottineau had worked for Sibley and Kittson for years, had accompanied Sioux and Ojibwe tribal delegates to Washington, D.C. as a "trusted interpreter" in 1849-50, immediately after the Woods-Pope foray to Pembina, had guided the first Ramsey expedition to Pembina in 1851 that resulted in the initial unratified treaty ceding Ojibwe claims to the Red River Valley, and had guided any number of government and military surveys, railroad surveys, sportsmen, journalists, settlers  and townsite promoters around the Red River Valley and other points south, east and west, both before and after the Ojibwe and Dakota ceded their territory for white settlement. The enterprising Bottineau himself had a hand in the founding of several townsites in Minnesota in the late 1850s, including the town of La Fayette, on the east side of the Red River of the North, in still unceded Ojibway territory, in 1857.

This same Bottineau now was engaged by Ramsey (escorted by Sibley) as one of his interpreters in treaty negotiations at the Old Crossing in 1863. In this capacity, Bottineau signed the treaty himself, and his nominal role as an interpreter often is characterized as "negotiator", probably for good reason. At the same time as Sibley loaned Ramsey the services of his guide and interpreter, Sibley also provided two companies of dragoons to escort Ramsey to the Old Crossing treaty grounds in late September 1863. 
  
Soon after the treaty was consummated, the principal beneficiary, Sibley's former partner in the fur trade, Norman Kittson, and Kittson's current partner in the steamboat and railroad business, James J. Hill, developed the first railroads through the Red River Valley and re-established the steamboat traffic on the Red River of the North.  Bottineau went on to found the town of Red Lake Falls and recruited French-Canadian immigrants to settle the recently ceded Ojibwe lands in nearby Louisville Township, where he also founded the townsite of Huot, the site of the Old Crossing Treaty negotiations as well as the former location of the ephemeral city of "Douglas" first county seat of Polk County. Ramsey, Sibley, Kittson and Hill continued their long careers in the business and politics of expansionism, railroading, banking and trade, forever identified as the builders of the State of Minnesota.

Conclusion

Surely, the Treaties of Old Crossing, in the words of Bishop Whipple, were "a fraud from start to finish"—the product of an incestuous and sustained collaboration of partners in business, politics and intrigue, if not of crime and corruption.

In reality, the Old Crossing Treaties were simply a means of taking land away from the Indians and passing it on to white settlers. They were the culmination of a deliberate and sustained political, economic and military campaign that had no possible outcome other than capitulation by the Ojibwe, even if they had understood the nature of the bargain they had reached. This was a campaign coordinated and carried out by a small group of well-connected collaborators who dominated the trade and business development of Northwestern Minnesota while also controlling the state's political and military apparatus. The treaties imposed a "peace" only in the sense that they removed Indians from the continued contest for control of the country.  As with most treaties, they defined a "peace" which was constructed for and defined by the victors while providing not much of anything for the losers.

Within ten years of signing the treaty, most of the ceded territory already had been made available for purchase, and within twenty years, by 1883, virtually all of it had been opened for settlement and homesteaded or sold as railroad land in the last great land boom of northern Minnesota and eastern North Dakota.  The Ojibwe bands receded to their reservations, which were themselves whittled away and substantially sold out from under them under the Dawes Act and other forced enactments of the United States Government.

See also
Dakota War of 1862
Huot, Minnesota

Notes

References

External links
For text of the initial Treaty of Old Crossing (1863), see WikiSource and the  University of Texas.
For text of the 1864 supplement to the 1863 treaty, known as the Treaty of Old Crossing (1864), see WikiSource and the  University of Texas.

Old Crossing
Sioux Wars
History of Minnesota
Pre-statehood history of North Dakota
1863 treaties